Nova Odesa is a city in Mykolaiv Raion, Mykolaiv Oblast (region) of southern Ukraine. It hosts the administration of Nova Odesa urban hromada, one of the hromadas of Ukraine. The population of Nova Odesa is 

Until 18 July 2020, Nova Odesa was the administrative center of Nova Odesa Raion. In July 2020, as part of the administrative reform of Ukraine, which reduced the number of raions of Mykolaiv Oblast to four, Nova Odesa Raion was merged into Mykolaiv Raion.

Gallery

References

External links
 The murder of the Jews of Nova Odesa during World War II, at Yad Vashem website.

Cities in Mykolaiv Oblast
Cities of district significance in Ukraine
Populated places on the Southern Bug
Khersonsky Uyezd
Holocaust locations in Ukraine